The 53rd edition of the KNVB Cup started on August 15, 1970. The final was played on May 20, 1971: Ajax beat Sparta 2–1 and won the cup for the sixth time.

Teams
 The 18 participants of the Eredivisie 1970-71
 The 16 participants of the Eerste Divisie 1970-71
 The 17 participants of the Tweede Divisie 1970–71

First round
The matches of the first round were played on August 15 and 16 1970. Cupholders Ajax E received a bye for this round.

E Eredivisie; 1 Eerste Divisie; 2 Tweede Divisie

Second round
The matches of the second round were played on November 8, 1970. The following clubs received a bye: Fortuna Sittard, FC Twente, Holland Sport, HFC Haarlem, Sparta Rotterdam and SC Drenthe.

Round of 16
The matches of the round of 16 were played on March 14, 1971.

Quarter finals
The quarter finals were played on April 7 and 8 1971.

Semi-finals
The semi-finals were played on April 21 and 22 1971.

Final
The final was played on May 5, 1971. The replay was played on May 20, 1971.

Sparta would participate in the Cup Winners' Cup, since Ajax finished second in the Eredivisie, already qualifying for the European Cup.

See also
 Eredivisie 1970–71
 Eerste Divisie 1970-71
 Tweede Divisie 1970–71

External links
 Netherlands Cup Full Results 1970–1994 by the RSSSF

1970-71
1970–71 domestic association football cups
KNVB Cup